Edward Kimball (1823-1901) was a Sunday School teacher known for converting Dwight L. Moody to Christianity. Kimball also assisted several churches across the United States in eliminating significant financial debts.

Early life
Edward Kimball was born in Rowley, Massachusetts in 1823 to Richard and Elizabeth Kimball. His parents wanted him to pursue religious studies, but illness at the time prevented Kimball from doing this. He would follow his father as a public school teacher in Rowley. Later, at age 23, Kimball moved to Boston. Eventually, he became head of Kimball, Felt and Wentworth, a firm of carpet dealers.

Sunday School teacher
While in Boston, Kimball joined the Mount Vernon Congregational Church and served as a church officer and Sunday School teacher. His class was filled with teenage boys, including Dwight L. Moody. During one of Moody’s first classes, Kimball asked the attendees to turn a specific Bible chapter in the book of John.  Moody, unfamiliar with the books of the Bible or the location of John, turned instead to the front of the Bible. Classmates laughed at Moody’s not knowing the books of the Bible.  Kimball, however, handed Moody his own Bible open to the correct passage and asked Moody to read it.  Moody was greatly impressed by Kimball’s kindness and continued to attend Sunday School.  In 1855, after nearly a year of lessons, Kimball visited Moody at his place of employment, Holton Shoe Store, a business owned by one of Moody’s uncles, and during conversation between the two, Moody was converted to Christianity.  Moody was seventeen years old at his conversion.

D. L. Moody would go on to evangelize worldwide and found the Northfield Seminary for Young Ladies and the Mount Hermon School for Boys, the Moody Bible Institute and Moody Publishing. 

In 1868, Edward Kimball, taking his family, left Boston and moved to New York to work in a wholesale hardware business.

Church debt raiser
Kimball and his family moved to Chicago, Illinois in 1872, the year after the Great Fire. He worked in sales for the A. H. Andrews and Company, a noted office and school furniture store. In 1877, while traveling for work in northern California, Kimball was troubled upon learning that several churches in the area had high debt.  He devised a plan to help reduce or eliminate the debt.  Kimball would become a “pioneer in the work of raising the debts” of various churches. In 1879, Kimball retired from the furniture firm to devote himself to church debt reduction.

Kimball’s method of reducing debt was simple, according to one news report. He would share with the congregation reasons why debt stifles the church’s work. He would then divide the total debt into manageable amounts. During a Sunday service, Kimball would publicly ask for members to volunteer to pay off specific amounts or subscriptions until the entire debt was accounted for. No one would be required to pay their subscription unless the entire debt was accounted for.

During the twenty-four years Kimball assisted churches, he raised $15 million to eliminate church debts. Churches included First Congregational Church of Oakland (CA) for $45,000, New York Presbyterian Church for $110,000, Union Park Congregational Church of Chicago for $30,000 and at least twenty others.

Family
Kimball and his first wife, Emma J. Henchman, had four children: Ella, Richard Henry, Edward Harris, and Harriet. About 1871, Richard Henry, who later became a prominent Chicago dentist, was visiting an uncle in Worcester, Massachusetts and attended a missions service conducted by evangelist Dwight L. Moody. Henry, as he was known, introduced himself to Moody as the son of Moody’s old Sunday School teacher. Moody asked if Henry was a Christian, and when Henry said he wasn’t sure, Moody spoke with him and eventually converted Henry to Christianity. Henry, like Moody at his own conversion, was seventeen years old.

Kimball married twice. His first wife, Emma, died in 1871. He married his second wife, Laura L. Harris of Brooklyn, New York, in 1873. Kimball died in 1901 after a short illness and was buried at Rosehill Cemetery and Mausoleum in Chicago, Illinois.

In popular culture
Edward Kimball’s conversion of D. L. Moody to Christianity has been used an example of the influence that one “ordinary” individual can have in spreading Christianity through evangelism. Religious scholars have noted the “direct chain” and growth in the number of Christian believers from Kimball’s conversion of Moody to evangelist Billy Graham.

References

1823 births
1901 deaths
People from Rowley, Massachusetts